Aubrey Darmody (17 May 1921 – 9 February 2006) was a Welsh footballer who played in the Football League as a full-back for Norwich City.

Career

Born in Swansea, Darmody played in Wales for Tower United and Cardiff Nomads before joining English Third Division South side Norwich City in 1946. He made two appearances for the Canaries, making his debut on Christmas Day 1946 away to Bournemouth in a 1–0 victory. He was on the team sheet for the return fixture the following day at Carrow Road in what was to be his final appearance for Norwich in a 6–1 defeat.

Darmody joined Colchester United in 1948, making his debut in a 2–1 Southern League win over Guildford City on 29 March. His final appearance came less than one month later in a 2–1 away defeat to Exeter City Reserves on 14 April 1948. After leaving Colchester, he signed for Great Yarmouth Town where he had a trophy named in his honour for the 'outstanding young player' of the year.

Aubrey Darmody died in Great Yarmouth on 9 February 2006, leaving behind wife Cindy.

References

1921 births
2006 deaths
Footballers from Swansea
Welsh footballers
Association football fullbacks
Norwich City F.C. players
Colchester United F.C. players
Great Yarmouth Town F.C. players
English Football League players
Southern Football League players